Deborah Twiss (born December 22, 1971) is an American actress, screenwriter, film director and producer. In the 2000s she became well-known with roles in films and television shows such as Kick-Ass, Gravity, Law & Order: Special Victims Unit and White Collar.

Career

Twiss was born in Philadelphia, Pennsylvania, and moved to New York City to study acting at age 17. Soon after, she became involved in writing and producing independent films. Her first feature, A Gun for Jennifer, was screened at 27 international film festivals and has become a European cult film. This led to her being cast in a series of lead and supporting roles in several independent films including Molotov Samba.

Twiss later appeared in TV shows including Law & Order: Special Victims Unit, Law & Order: Criminal Intent, White Collar, and Gravity as well as feature films such as In Between. She has two children, Matthew and Sydney McCann, who played characters based on them in her film A Cry From Within, inspired by experiences they had as a family.
	
In the film Kick-Ass, she portrayed the mock superhero's teacher-crush, Mrs. Zane. Post Kick-Ass, Twiss appeared in the Michael Chiklis-produced Pawn and in A.D. Calvo's The Midnight Game, and appeared opposite Eric Roberts in A Cry From Within, which wrapped principal photography in spring 2014. She has also appeared in The Networker opposite Sean Young and William Forsythe.

Tapping her independent film experience, Twiss is developing several projects in which she will play lead roles including Just In Time, Parallel Veins, the horror comedy film Bloody Ultimatum, and a revenge horror film Contract With A Demon. She wrote and co-directed 2014 the Horror mystery thriller film A Cry from Within, which was co-directed with Zach Miller.

Filmography

Film

Television

References

External links

Living people
American film actresses
American television actresses
Film producers from Pennsylvania
Screenwriters from Pennsylvania
American women screenwriters
1971 births
Actresses from Philadelphia
Writers from Philadelphia
Film directors from Pennsylvania
American women film producers
21st-century American women